The former Oulu Province in Finland was divided on two regions, nine sub-regions and 43 municipalities.

Northern Ostrobothnia

Oulu sub-region
Hailuoto
Haukipudas
Kempele
Kiiminki
Liminka
Lumijoki
Muhos
Oulu (Uleåborg)
Oulunsalo
Tyrnävä
Oulunkaari sub-region
Ii
Pudasjärvi
Utajärvi
Yli-Ii

Raahe sub-region
Pyhäjoki
Raahe (Brahestad)
Siikajoki
Vihanti
Siikalatva sub-region
Haapavesi
Pyhäntä
Siikalatva
Nivala–Haapajärvi sub-region
Haapajärvi
Kärsämäki
Nivala
Pyhäjärvi
Reisjärvi
Ylivieska sub-region
Alavieska
Kalajoki
Merijärvi
Oulainen
Sievi
Ylivieska
Koillismaa sub-region
Kuusamo
Taivalkoski

Kainuu

Kehys-Kainuu sub-region
Hyrynsalmi (8)
Kuhmo (6)
Puolanka (9)
Suomussalmi (7)
Kajaani sub-region
Kajaani (Kajana) (1)
Paltamo (3)
Ristijärvi (4)
Sotkamo (5)
Vaala (2)

See also
Municipalities of Northern Ostrobothnia
Municipalities of Kainuu

Oulu Province